Baicu may refer to:

Rivers
Baicu (Iza), tributary of the river Iza in Romania
Baicu, tributary of the river Șes in Romania

People
Ilie Baicu (b. 1974), Romanian football player
Mihai Baicu (1975–2009), Romanian football player
Raoul Baicu (b.2000), Romanian professional footballer

Romanian-language surnames